Legea (stylised as LEGEA) is an Italian sportswear company, founded in 1993 by brothers Giovanni, Emilia and Luigi Acanfora. It is one of the most popular brands among Italian amateur football teams, then expanding to professional clubs.

Legea is a technical sponsor of the Montenegro national team. It also sponsors teams such as Palermo, Cosenza calcio, Reggina calcio and Livorno calcio in Italy, Nac Breda and N.E.C. in the Netherlands, the New Saints FC and Carmarthen Town FC in Wales, CD Feirense in Portugal,  Lommel United in Belgium,  FC Chernomorets and Futbol'nyj Klub L'vivin in  Ukraine,  Spatak subotika in Serbia, NK Celje in Slovenia, Levadiakos and Athlītikī Enōsī Larisas 1964 in Greece, Ermis Aradippou in Cyprus.

Legea was the only Italian brand to sponsor a national team in the 2010 FIFA World Cup, the national team of North Korea. Legea is headquartered in Pompei and has Legea Points (shops) throughout Italy. It also has distributors in Europe, Canada, the United States and Australia.

History

During the 2010 FIFA World Cup in South Africa, Legea sponsored the North Korean soccer team. According to the company, "Many ask us what interest we could have in sponsoring North Korea, and whether this could not amount to negative publicity, but we disagree... there is no negative publicity."

Current sponsorships
The following teams wear uniforms manufactured and provided by Legea:

Basketball

National teams
  (Since July 2015)

Club teams
 PBC Lukoil Academic
 KK Dubrava
 Nuova Napoli Basket
 Societa Veroli Basket   
 Unione Cestistica Casalpusterlengo 
 Basket Barcellona
 Orlandina Basket 
 BC Mazembe
 Círculo Gijón

Wheelchair basketball

Club teams
 Santo Stefano (Since 2020/2021 season)

Handball

Club teams
 RK Metković
 RK Lovćen

Football

National teams
Asia
 Palestine (Olympic team)
 DPR Korea (2010 FIFA World Cup South Africa) (AFC Asian Cup 2011 Qatar)
Americas
 Saint Vincent and the Grenadines  (2019)
Europe
 Montenegro

Match officials
 A-League  (Since 2020/2021 season)
 Gibraltar National League
 Serie A
 Welsh Premier League
 Schleswig-Holstein-Liga

Club teams

 Besëlidhja
 Lushnja
 North Geelong Warriors
 Falcons 2000
 St Albans Saints
 Moreland City FC
 Bayswater City SC
 Rockdale Ilinden FC
 Ravan Baku
 Riffa
 K.S.K. Beveren    (Since 2022/2023 season) 
 Deinze
 FK Mladost Doboj Kakanj
 FK Sloboda Tuzla
 NK Jedinstvo Bihać
 Chernomorets Balchik
 Vidima-Rakovski
 FC Shumen
 Septemvri Simitli
 Benfica Santa Cruz
 Varaždin
 Aris Limassol
 Elpida Xylofagou
 Ermis Aradippou
 Onisilos Sotira
 El Sharkia SC  (Since 2016/2017 season)
Wingate & Finchley
 St Joseph's    (Since 2021/2022 season) 
 Rodos F.C.
 Egri FC
 Mezőkövesd-Zsóry SE
 Szombathelyi Haladás
 Rah Ahan F.C.
 Zob Ahan Club  (Since 2016/2017 season)
 Finn Harps  (Since 2014/2015 season) 
 F.C. Ashdod
 Hapoel Jerusalem F.C.
  Aversa Normanna
 F.C. Aprilia
  Battipagliese  (Since 2021/2022 season)
  Gubbio
 Renate
 Akragas
 Real Vicenza                                                                  
 Cosenza Calcio
 Cuneo
 Gaeta
 Gallipoli
 Giulianova
 Calcio Lecco 1912
 Melfi
 S.C. Vallée d'Aoste
 HinterReggio Calcio
 A.S.D. Battipagliese
 A.C. Isola Liri
 Pianese
 Renate  (Since 2022/2023 season)
 Sansepolcro
 Siena (Since 2022/2023 season)
 Savoia (Since 2022/2023 season)
 Sora
 Teramo (Since 2018/2019 season)
 Vittoria
 Acri
 Marsala
 Romagna Centro           
 Ramtha                           
 Gor Mahia
 Sofapaka
 Thika United
 Tusker
 Flamurtari
 Vëllaznimi
 DFK Dainava
 Żurrieq F.C. (Start 2018/2019 season).
 Penang FA (Start 2017 season) 
 FK Budućnost
 FK Zeta 
 NAC Breda
 NEC Nijmegen
 Roda JC Kerkrade (Since 2019/2020 season)
 April 25
 Pyongyang City
 Sobaeksu
 Borec 
 FK Napredok Kičevo
 Mladost Carev Dvor
 Pelister (Since 2021/2022 season)
 Jantar Ustka Junior C
 FC Torpedo Moscow
 Gernika Club
 CD Izarra
 UP Langreo
 CD Lealtad
 Real Balompédica Linense
 FK Jagodina
 FK Spartak Subotica  (Since 2015/16 season)
 FK Timok Zaječar 
 Dalkkurd  (Since 2022/23 season)
 FC Morbio
 US Ben Guerdane
 Metalurh Zaporizhzhia
 Kudrivka
 Aragua FC
 Afan Lido F.C.
 The New Saints
 Hackensack Strikers F.C.   
 L.I.A.C. New York
 L.I.A.C. Polonia Bytom Krolowa Polski

Futsal

Club teams

 Luparense Calcio a 5 (Since 2014/15 season)
 Atletico Belvedere Calcio a 5 (Since 2014/15 season)
 Latina Calcio a 5

Rugby union

Club teams
 US Montauban
 Stabia Wasps
 Polisportiva Partenope Rugby

Volleyball

Club teams
 Sora Volley
 Corigliano  (Since 2014-15 season)
 San Giustino Volley
 Pallavolo Matera Bulls
 ASV Dachau
 VKS Joker Piła

Roller and Skating

National teams
  Italy

Club teams
 Bassano Hockey 54  (Since the 2014/2015 season)

Roller in-line hockey

National teams
  Italy

Tambour

National teams
  Hungeria

Dancesport

Club teams
 Grace MSU

TV and Shows

 Italia's Got Talent
 Sportitalia
 Football Hub

See also

 
 Sergio Tacchini

References

External links
 

Athletic shoe brands
Shoe brands
Clothing companies established in 1990
Italian companies established in 1990
Sporting goods manufacturers of Italy
Sportswear brands
Shoe companies of Italy
Italian brands
Companies based in Campania